Jonah Who Will Be 25 in the Year 2000 is a 1976 Swiss drama film directed by Alain Tanner and written by Tanner and John Berger.  The location of the shooting was Geneva.

The film follows the lives of couples in the wake of the social and political tumult of May 1968 in France, the various people including a history professor, a trade unionist and a bohemian.

Cast
 Jean-Luc Bideau as Max
 Myriam Boyer as Mathilde
 Raymond Bussières as Charles
 Jacques Denis as Marco Perly
 Roger Jendly as Marcel Certoux
 Dominique Labourier as Marguerite Certoux
  as Madeleine
 Miou-Miou as Marie
 Rufus as Mathieu Vernier

Reception
The film was favourably reviewed by Pauline Kael in The New Yorker:  "The whole film is designed as a collection of little routines. Jonah is so ingeniously constructed that one can enjoy it the way one enjoyed Renoir's egalitarian films of the thirties, relating to each character in turn."

The film was selected as the Swiss entry for the Best Foreign Language Film at the 49th Academy Awards, but was not accepted as a nominee.

See also
 List of submissions to the 49th Academy Awards for Best Foreign Language Film
 List of Swiss submissions for the Academy Award for Best Foreign Language Film

References

External links
 

1976 films
French drama films
Swiss drama films
1970s French-language films
Films directed by Alain Tanner
1976 drama films
Films shot in Switzerland
French-language Swiss films
1970s French films